Zinfandel is a side platformed Sacramento RT Light Rail station in Rancho Cordova, California, United States. The station was opened on June 11, 2004, and is operated by the Sacramento Regional Transit District. It is served by the Gold Line. Across the street from the stop is the popular Rancho Cordova Town Center mall.

The station was originally intended for construction along Folsom, east of Zinfandel Drive. However, RT officials moved the station location west of Zinfandel after requests by the Rancho Cordova Area Chamber of Commerce due to the better location adjacent to retail centers. Zinfandel, along with Cordova Town Center and Sunrise, opened on June 11, 2004, as part of an $89 million,  extension of the Gold Line east of the Mather Field/Mills station. Rancho Cordova city officials have stated the establishment of the stations will help in the development of transit-oriented development/redevelopment of the Folsom corridor through the city.

Platforms and tracks

References

Sacramento Regional Transit light rail stations
Rancho Cordova, California
Railway stations in the United States opened in 2004
2004 establishments in California